Hecate Strait and Queen Charlotte Sound Glass Sponge Reefs Marine Protected Area (HS/QCS MPA) is a 2,410-square-kilometre marine protected area located in Hecate Strait and Queen Charlotte Sound off the North Coast of British Columbia, Canada. The marine protected area was established in February 2017 with the goal of conserving the biological diversity, structural habitat, and ecosystem function of four glass sponge reefs. These reefs were the first discovered living specimens and are the largest glass sponge reefs in the world.

History
Prior to their discovery in 1987, glass sponge reefs were believed to have been extinct worldwide since the end of the Jurassic period. The formation of glass sponge reefs requires a combination of unique geological conditions combined with the occurrence of the reef-forming species of Hexactinellid sponges.

In 2018, the marine protected area was added to UNESCO's tentative list of World Heritage Sites.

See also
Endeavour Hydrothermal Vents Marine Protected Area
SGaan Kinghlas-Bowie Seamount Marine Protected Area

References

External links
Underwater vehicle footage of the reefs, Fisheries and Oceans Canada, 2012

Marine Protected Areas of Canada
Nature reserves in British Columbia
Protected areas established in 2017